The Community Building, also known as the War Memorial Building and the American Legion Building, is a historic building in Sparta, Tennessee, U.S.. It was built in 1935. It includes a plaque to the memory of veterans of World War I, World War II, the Korean War and the Vietnam War.

The building was designed in the Classical Revival architectural style. It has been listed on the National Register of Historic Places since May 20, 2002.

The words "American Legion" run across the top of the front facade.  The local American Legion post participated in the construction, and later (in 1946) purchased the building.

See also
List of American Legion buildings

References

American Legion buildings
National Register of Historic Places in White County, Tennessee
Neoclassical architecture in Tennessee
Buildings and structures completed in 1935